Cui Naifu (born 1928) is a Chinese politician who served as minister of civil affairs from 1982 to 1993.

He was a member of the 12th, 13th, and 14th Central Committee of the Chinese Communist Party.

Biography
Cui was born in Changping County (now Changping District of Beijing), Hebei, in 1928. He joined the Chinese Communist Party (CCP) in 1948.

After founding of the Communist State in 1949, he successively served as secretary for the Party Chief of the CCP Shanxi Provincial Committee, director of the National Commission for Sales Cooperation, head of the Publicity Department of the CCP Lanzhou University Committee, and deputy party secretary of Lanzhou University.

In 1978, he became vice minister of civil affairs, rising to minister in 1982.

Works

References

1928 births
Living people
Ministers of Civil Affairs of the People's Republic of China
People's Republic of China politicians from Beijing
Chinese Communist Party politicians from Beijing
Members of the 12th Central Committee of the Chinese Communist Party
Members of the 13th Central Committee of the Chinese Communist Party
Members of the 14th Central Committee of the Chinese Communist Party